Noor Dean is a Fiji Indian lawyer and politician who served in the Suva City Council and was elected to the House of Representatives of Fiji in 1987.

Early life and education
He was born in Suva, Fiji in 1946, the oldest boy in a family of 12. His father, the late Rahmat Dean was a popular architect who designed the Toorak Mosque in Suva.

Politics
Dean served in the Suva City Council since 1972, representing the National Federation Party and was elected Suva's Lord Mayor for the 1982–1983 term. Noor served the largest and oldest political party as Branch Secretary, Youth Leader, National Organising Secretary and National Vice-president.

He was also a close confidant of three of the Leaders of Opposition and worked closely as a loyalist for Sidiq Koya, A. D. Patel, Karam Ramrakha (his mentor) and Irene Jai Narayan.

He has also been a Trade Unionist with the Fiji Teachers Union where he rose to the position of Assistant General Secretary.
 
For the 1987 general election, the NFP-Labour Coalition chose him as a candidate for the Labasa/Bua Indian Communal Constituency which he won easily.  He was elected the Deputy Speaker but was a member of Parliament for a month when the 1987 Fijian coups d'état prematurely ended his political career.

He was elected as a vice-president for the International Congress for Fiji Indians (ICFI) for 2005–2007.

Religion
Dean participated in the Fiji Muslim League.

He has served as Vice President of the Islamic Council of Victoria (ICV) and is a founding member of the Australian Islamic Foundation Inc. He has served the Fiji Islamic Society in various capacities as the Vice President, Secretary and President, since 1989.

Adult life
He is married with five children and currently resides in Victoria, Australia.

He has worked as a principal and school teacher.

Legal career
He is a British educated Lawyer, a Barrister of Gray's Inn (1980).

He was called to the Bar in the United Kingdom, and has worked as a lawyer in Fiji and Australia.

He was a Partner in a 50-year-old established law firm, Buxton and Associates, based in Victoria, Australia. Currently, he is the Principal at MLC Lawyers in Melbourne.

References 

1946 births
Living people
Fijian Muslims
Members of Gray's Inn
National Federation Party politicians
Indian members of the House of Representatives (Fiji)
Fijian expatriates in the United Kingdom
Fijian emigrants to Australia
Australian Muslims
Australian people of Indo-Fijian descent
Lord Mayors of Suva
20th-century Fijian lawyers